Oume may refer to:

 Oumé Department, a department of Côte d'Ivoire
 Oumé, a city, as well as a sub-prefecture and seat of the department
 Oume, a character in Yotsuya Kaidan, a Japanese ghost story
 Daigoro Oume, a character in Kaizoku Sentai Gokaiger, a Japanese TV show/franchise

See also
 Ome (disambiguation)